

Uniforms and Protective equipment 
  Adrian helmet
 Combat uniform (go to France section)

Weapons 
 List of World War II weapons of France

Utility vehicles 
  P107
 Laffly S15
 Laffly V15
 SOMUA MCG
 Citroën U23
 Renault AGx

Maginot Line 

 Maginot Line

Aircraft 
 List of aircraft of the French Air Force during World War II

Ships 

 List of Classes of French ships of World War II

References

Military equipment of World War II